E. Subaya is an Indian politician and incumbent member of the Tamil Nadu Legislative Assembly from the Ambasamudram constituency. He represents the Anna Dravida Munnetra Kazhagam party.

Subaya was sacked as the Minister for Law, Courts and Prisons in June 2011 by Chief Minister Jayalalithaa. His replacement, G. Senthamizhan, was sacked in November of the same year.

References 

All India Anna Dravida Munnetra Kazhagam politicians
Living people
Year of birth missing (living people)
Tamil Nadu MLAs 2021–2026